La Motte-Tilly is a commune in the Aube department in north-central France. The Château de La Motte-Tilly is situated in the commune.

Population

See also
Communes of the Aube department

References

Communes of Aube
Aube communes articles needing translation from French Wikipedia